Ctenodes guianensis is a species of beetle in the family Cerambycidae. It was described by Tavakilian & Touroult in 2009.

References

Trachyderini
Beetles described in 2009